Dev-Kesken (Turkmen:) is an archaeological site in the Dashoguz region of northern Turkmenistan, 62 km west of Koneurgench.

Location 
It is located at the edges of a 30 km-long escarpment, on the southern tip of the Ustyurt Plateau.

History 
The site appears to have been settled around 4th century BCE. It corresponds to the medieval settlement of Vazir; in 1558, English traveler Anthony Jenkinson had visited the town and spoken favorably of the local melon produce. Jenkinson already noted the rivers to be drying and Vazir would be abandoned soon.

Site 
The sides of the city facing the plateau are walled. Within the city, lie the ruins of three mausolea —dating to 15th century— and a mosque. A citadel with corrugated walls overlooks the escarpment.

Tourism 
The site was a tourism mainstay till c. 2003, when Turkmen Army started prohibiting visitors on the ground that the access-road passed through Uzbek territory.

Notes

References 

Archaeological sites in Turkmenistan
Daşoguz Region
4th century BC in Turkmenistan